The Henry Weis House is a historic building located in Waterloo, Iowa, United States.  Weis was a factory owner that produced egg case fillers, which were used to protect eggs during shipping.  He engaged the local architectural firm of Murphy & Ralston to design this house, which was completed in 1902.  Architecturally, the two-story frame structure is "transitional" in its design, featuring elements of the Queen Anne and the Colonial Revival styles.  The Queen Anne is found in its irregular plan, wraparound porch, full-height bays, small second floor porch, and the small screened porch.  The Colonial Revival is found in the Ionic fluted porch columns, and the consoles with a row of dentils located along the cornice.  The house also features foliated designs on the gable ends.  It remained in the Weis family into the 1930s when it was converted into apartments.  It has subsequently been converted into a bed and breakfast.  The house was listed on the National Register of Historic Places in 1989.

References

Houses completed in 1902
Queen Anne architecture in Iowa
Colonial Revival architecture in Iowa
Bed and breakfasts in Iowa
Houses in Waterloo, Iowa
National Register of Historic Places in Black Hawk County, Iowa
Houses on the National Register of Historic Places in Iowa